English Freakbeat, Volume 4 is a compilation album in the English Freakbeat series, featuring recordings that were released decades earlier, in the mid-1960s.

Release data

The album was released as an LP in 1989 by AIP Records (as #AIP-10051) and as a CD in 1997 (as #AIP-CD-1051).

Vinyl-only tracks and CD bonus tracks

The English Freakbeat LPs and CDs have most tracks in common, although not always in the same order.  In most cases, some of the LP tracks were not included on the CDs, although that is not true of this album.  Also, the CD bonus tracks are not always at the end of the album.  Thus, for clarity, we have shown tracks for both editions of the album, with vinyl-only tracks and CD bonus tracks indicated.

Notes on the tracks

The following information is taken mostly from the CD liner notes.  Thane Russal released a single under his real name, Doug Gibbons for Decca Records in 1965.  "Security" comes from the first of two later singles for CBS Records that were produced by Paul Raven, one of several alter egos for the man who is best known as Gary Glitter; "I Need You", from the second single, is on English Freakbeat, Volume 5.  

Cops & Robbers were from Watford and eventually added Doug Stephens, formerly of the Fairies.  These two tracks come from an ultra-rare French EP.  

The Clique is a London band whose "She Ain't No Good" is from their first of only two singles.  "We Didn't Kiss", from their second single is on the 10th volume in the Rubble series. 

One of the CD bonus tracks is by the In Crowd (later renamed Tomorrow) and is taken from their first single, before Steve Howe joined the band; Les Jones handles lead guitar on this selection.  Their "Why Must They Criticise" can be found on English Freakbeat, Volume 3; an earlier incarnation of this band as the Four + 1 – not to be confused with Unit 4 + 2 – released "Don't Lie to Me" that is included on English Freakbeat, Volume 5 (also as a CD bonus track only). 

"Forget It" is an early recording by Mal Ryder – this time with the Spirits – and comes from four singles that they released from 1963 to early 1965.  Yet another track by his later band, the Primitives is also included; five of their songs can be found on English Freakbeat, Volume 1 (along with additional information on the band in that article). 

The stage garb of the Snobs was in the style of the 18th century; their debut 1964 single "Buckle Shoe Stomp" failed to chart in the UK but was a hit in Sweden.  "Ding Dong" was the "B" side of a fine version of "Heartbreak Hotel" that was released only in Sweden; the hit rendition of the song was by the Equals. 

Little is known about the Sons of Fred, but all of their available recordings that are not included on English Freakbeat, Volume 3 are CD bonus tracks on this album. 

Tony Dangerfield is backed by a band called the Thrills on this rockabilly-style number that was also recorded by the Honeycombs; both versions were produced by Joe Meek.  Dangerfield is rumored to have been a member of the Raving Savages, the backing band for Screaming Lord Sutch (a surf rock recording by this band is on English Freakbeat, Volume 3), as well as Rupert's People who are also featured on that volume in a vinyl-only track. 

Two other tracks by the Wheels can be found on English Freakbeat, Volume 2, and further information on the band is provided in the article on that album. 

Mickey Finn and the Blue Men included Jimmy Page, but he did not join the band until a month before "Reelin' and Rockin'" was issued and may not have participated in its recording.  Later music by the band, known as the Mickey Finn or just Mickey Finn is included on English Freakbeat, Volume 2. 

Shorty & Them is a band from Newcastle that relocated to Germany and released an album there in conjunction with a Liverpool band, the Roadrunners; this long version of "Dimples" is taken from that LP. 

Several extremely rare beat singles have surfaced in very limited pressings on the Oak Records label, including this pair from the otherwise unknown 4 Degrees. 

Stovepipe No. 4 is an unusual name for a band by anyone's standards and is known only from an amazing 3-song EP that they released in Hungary of all places that included a nice treatment of the Bo Diddley classic (the Pretty Things took their name from this song).

Track listing

LP

Side 1:

 Tony Dangerfield: "She's Too Way Out"
 The Others: "Oh Yeah" — rel. 1964
 The Soul Agents: "Don't Break it Up"
 The Soul Agents: "Mean Woman Blues" (Roy Orbison)
 Thane Russal & Three: "Security"
 Mal Ryder & the Spirits: "Forget It" — rel. 1964
 The Snobs: "Ding Dong"

Side 2:

 The Syndicats: "Crawdaddy Simone"
 The Primitives: "Johnny No"
 Cops & Robbers: "I've Found Out"
 Cops & Robbers: "You'll Never Do it Baby"
 Mickey Finn & the Bluemen: "Reelin' and Rockin'"
 The Wheels: "Call My Name"
 Shorty and Them: "Dimples"

CD

 Thane Russal & Three: "Security"
 Cops & Robbers: "I've Found Out"
 Cops & Robbers: "You'll Never Do it Baby"
 The Clique: "She Ain't No Good" — rel. 1965, CD bonus track
 The In Crowd: "Things She Said" — rel. 1965, CD bonus track
 Mal Ryder and the Spirits: "Forget It" — rel. 1964
 The Snobs: "Ding Dong"
 The Sons of Fred: "Baby What You Want Me to Do", CD bonus track
 The Sons of Fred: "I'll Be There", CD bonus track
 The Sons of Fred: "Sweet Love", CD bonus track
 The Soul Agents: "Don't Break it Up"
 The Soul Agents: "Mean Woman Blues"
 The Soul Agents: "I Just Wanna Make Love to You", CD bonus track
 The Syndicats: "Crawdaddy Simone"
 Tony Dangerfield: "She's Too Way Out"
 The Wheels: "Call My Name"
 Mickey Finn and the Blue Men: "Reelin' & Rockin'"
 The Others: "Oh Yeah" (Elias B. McDaniel) — rel. 1964
 The Primitives: "Johnny Noooooo!!!"
 Shorty & Them: "Dimples"
 4 Degrees: "Too Much Monkey Business", CD bonus track
 4 Degrees: "I've Got My Brand on You", CD bonus track
 Stovepipe No. 4: "Pretty Thing" (Elias B. McDaniel), CD bonus track

1989 compilation albums
Compilation albums by British artists
Pop rock compilation albums
Psychedelic rock compilation albums